

Duchess consort of Bremen and Verden

House of Vasa, 1648–1654
Christina of Sweden was Queen of Sweden, not a consort.

House of Palatinate-Zweibrücken, 1654–1719

House of Hanover, 1715–1823

Notes

 
Bremen and Verden
German duchesses